Belgrave Lodge is a house at the west end of Belgrave Avenue, the road connecting the B5445 road between Chester and Wrexham, and Eaton Hall, Cheshire, England.  It is recorded in the National Heritage List for England as a designated Grade II listed building.

History
The lodge was built in 1889 to a design by the Chester architects Douglas and Fordham for the 1st Duke of Westminster.  The ground floor has since been converted into a restaurant.

Architecture
The house is built in brick with stone bands and dressings on a stone plinth.  The hipped roof has red tiles with lead finials.  As a whole the house has 1½ storeys and is in two bays.  It has three chimneys with red-brick barley-sugar flues and stone plinths and caps.  The window openings are mullioned, and contain casement windows.  There are two single-storey buildings at the rear, one with a gabled roof, the other with a hipped roof.

See also

 Listed buildings in Eaton, Cheshire West and Chester
 List of houses and associated buildings by John Douglas

References

John Douglas buildings
Houses completed in 1889
Grade II listed buildings in Cheshire
Grade II listed houses
Houses in Cheshire